Peace dividend was a political slogan popularized by US President George H. W. Bush and UK Prime Minister Margaret Thatcher in the light of the 1988–1991 dissolution of the Soviet Union, that described the economic benefit of a decrease in defense spending. The term was frequently used at the end of the Cold War, when many Western nations significantly cut military spending such as Britain's 1990 Options for Change defence review. It is now used primarily in discussions relating to the guns versus butter theory.

Validity
While economies do undergo a recession after the end of a major conflict as the economy is forced to adjust and retool, a "peace dividend" refers to a potential long-term benefit as budgets for defense spending are assumed  to be at least partially redirected to social programs and/or a decrease in taxation rates.  The existence of a peace dividend in real economies is still debated, but some research points to its reality.

A political discussion about the peace dividend resulting from the end of the Cold War involves a debate about which countries have actually scaled back military spending and which have not. The scale back in defense spending was mainly noticeable in Western Europe and in the Russian Federation. The United States, whose military spending was rapidly reducing between 1985 and 1993 and remained flat between 1993 and 1999, increased strongly after September 11, 2001, funding conflicts including the War on Terror, the War in Afghanistan and the War in Iraq.

Notes

Political economy
Peace
Military economics
Dissolution of the Soviet Union